is a very small Apollo asteroid that passed near Earth at an altitude of  on 2 March 2009 at 13:44 UTC. It was discovered by Australian astronomers with the Siding Spring Survey at the Siding Spring Observatory on 27 February 2009, only three days before its closest approach to the Earth. Its estimated diameter is between 15 and 23 metres. This is about the same size as a hypothetical object that could have caused the Tunguska event in 1908.

With an observation arc of 7 days and an uncertainty parameter of 3, the asteroid will make its next close encounter with Earth on 29 February 2056 and then potentially around 3 March 2067.

See also 
 List of asteroid close approaches to Earth in 2009

References

External links 
 Universe Today article on 2009 DD45
 100-meter asteroid will pass Earth Monday!, Phil Plait's Bad Astronomy blog
 
 List Of Apollo Minor Planets (by designation), Minor Planet Center
 
 
 

Minor planet object articles (unnumbered)
20090302
20090227